The British Grand Prix is an annual men's squash tournament that takes place at the National Squash Centre in Manchester.

The tournament was part of the PSA World Series (2010-2011), the most prestigious class of event in the PSA World Tour. The tournament was founded in 2010 and takes place in September. The first two editions of the tournament were won by Egyptian Ramy Ashour. It was a partial replacement of the British Open Squash Championships, which were suspended in 2010 and restarted in 2012.

Past Results

References

External links
britishsquashgrandprix.com - Official website

Squash tournaments in the United Kingdom
Sports competitions in Manchester
Recurring sporting events established in 2010
2010 establishments in the United Kingdom
Squash in England